The Clan Alpine Mountains are a mountain range located in west-central Nevada in the United States. The mountains lie to the west of the Desatoya Mountains and southeast of the Stillwater Range. The Augusta Mountains lie to the northeast and the New Pass Range to the east. A large part of the range, lies within the Clan Alpine Mountains Wilderness Study Area. The Clan Alpine Mountains lie to the north and northwest of Highway 50.

Clan Alpine Mountains took its name from a nearby mining district. At least eight mines are located in the northwestern part of the range north of Healy Peak in the Bernice and Hoyt canyons on the northwest flank of the range. This mine group was worked from 1866 and known as the Bernice, Salina or Alamo district. The mines produced antimony, silver, gold and tungsten.

References

Mineral Resources of the Clan Alpine Mountains, Study Area, Churchill County, Nevada, Mineral Land Assessment 1987, Open File Report

Mountain ranges of Nevada
Mountain ranges of Churchill County, Nevada